1. FC Germania Egestorf/Langreder is a German association football club from the town of Barsinghausen, Lower Saxony. The club's greatest success has been promotion to the tier four Regionalliga Nord in 2016. By reaching the final of the 2015–16 Lower Saxony Cup the club also qualified for the German Cup for the first time, entering the first round of the 2016–17 edition.

History
The club was formed on 16 March 2001 when two local clubs, TSV Egestorf and TSV Langreder, merged to form the current club in an effort to combine the extensive youth department of the former with the senior team of the latter.

The new club took started out in the tier seven Bezirksliga Hannover 1 but won promotion from this level to the Landesliga Hannover in 2003. It spent the next nine seasons there, with the league renamed to Bezirksoberliga Hannover from 2006 to 2010. After finishing runners-up in 2008 and 2010 and missing out on promotion Germania won the league in 2011–12 and earned promotion to the Niedersachsenliga for the first time. At this level the club finished sixth in its first season and gradually improving every year. A second place finish in 2015–16 and success in the promotion round moved the club up to the tier four Regionalliga Nord for the first time. They were relegated in 2019.

The club qualified for the final of the Lower Saxony Cup and thereby directly for the first round of the 2016–17 DFB-Pokal. They lost 6–0 in the first round at home to Hoffenheim.

Current squad

Honours
The club's honours:
 Landesliga Hannover
 Champions: 2011–12
 Lower Saxony Cup
 Runners-up: 2016

Seasons
The season-by-season performance of the club:

 The Landesliga Hannover was renamed to Bezirksoberliga Hannover from 2006 to 2010.

References

External links
Official club site 
Germania Egestorf at Weltfussball.de 

Football clubs in Germany
Football clubs in Lower Saxony
Association football clubs established in 2001
2001 establishments in Germany